The Savannah Philharmonic is an American professional orchestra that performs concerts in Savannah, Georgia. It is also a 501(c)3 nonprofit organization. The orchestra made its debut in January 2009 under conductor Peter Shannon and is currently guided by the baton of Maestro Keitaro Harada.

References

External links
YouTube channel

Culture of Savannah, Georgia
Orchestras based in Georgia (U.S. state)